The Chapel of Our Lady of the Snows is a 16th-century Roman Catholic church located on the Ilha de Maré in the Bay of All Saints, Bahia, Brazil. The island is administratively part of the city of Salvador. The chapel is dedicated to Blessed Virgin Mary and belongs to the Roman Catholic Archdiocese of São Salvador da Bahia. Its construction is dated to 1552, and is among the oldest existing churches in Brazil. It was part of the sugar plantation of André Fernandes Margalho. The church was listed as a historic structure by the National Historic and Artistic Heritage Institute in 1958. The historian Mário Mendonça de Oliveira calls it a "one of the gems of old Brazilian religious architecture".

History

Reference to the Chapel of Our Lady of the Snows appears in a report by Gabriel Soares, who wrote in 1587 about "a new church of Our Lady of the Snows, with a fine finish, as part of the sugar plantation belonging to André Fernandes Margalho." Its construction predates that of the Jesuit College in Salvador, built between 1561 and 1585.

Protected status

The Chapel of Our Lady of the Snows was listed as a historic structure by the National Institute of Historic and Artistic Heritage in 1958. Both the structure and its contents were included in the IPHAN directive under inscription number 574.

Access

The Chapel of Our Lady of the Snows is open to the public and may be visited.

Footnote

A.In Portuguese: uma fresca igreja de Nossa Senhora das Neves muito bem acabada, o qual engenho é de André Fernandes Margalho.

See also

List of Catholic churches in Salvador, Bahia

References

Roman Catholic churches in Salvador, Bahia
16th-century Roman Catholic church buildings in Brazil
National heritage sites of Bahia
Portuguese colonial architecture in Brazil